Family Group Broadcasting, L.P. was a Delaware-incorporated, Florida-based television and radio broadcasting company. A small company, based in and around Tampa Bay, the company operated from the early 1980s to about 1997. Throughout its history, it owned and/or operated several different radio and television stations – all of its television stations independents (initially), on the UHF dial east of the Mississippi River. Also, the company operated under the names Family Broadcasting Company, Inc., Family Group Entertainment and Family Group Ltd. III.

Many of the stations shared the same type of branding with their channel number in chrome silver inside a red-violet diamond and the station's call letters in white text inside a blue parallelogram underneath, along with a common imaging theme with the name of the group in the lyrics, 'TV that's fun! We bring you...Family fun!'.

Former stations

Television stations 

 1 Stations built and/or signed-on by Family Group Broadcasting.
 2 Family Group Broadcasting had a 50 percent stake in the station. Also, Heritage Media, then-owners of ABC affiliate WEAR-TV, took control of the station under a Local marketing agreement beginning in 1995 and lasting until 1997, when both stations and the rest of Heritage Media's television stations division were acquired by and absorbed into Sinclair Broadcast Group.
 3 WLKT-TV was partially owned by Family Group Broadcasting in a "50–50" joint venture with a non-profit company, Way of the Cross, Inc. and was founded in 1983. However, the station didn't sign-on until 1988. Due to low viewership from a contract requiring Way of the Cross's religious programming to air in prime time slots, questionable reception and not being able to find a buyer, the two companies took the station off the air less than a year later and subsequently returned the license to the Federal Communications Commission. In 1999, a new low-power station took to the air on channel 62, WBLU-LP, but itself was troubled and taken off the air after being sold to Daystar in 2009.

Radio stations 

 1 The station today, operates as a simulcast of now-sister station, WANG 1490 AM, which in turn also operates a translator, W278CE on 103.5 FM.
 2 As of May 2020, the station is temporarily off the air as repairs are ongoing to its transmitter. As a result, its sports radio format is currently on WAVK 97.7 FM in the meantime.
 3 The station today, operates as a simulcast of now-sister station, WFKZ 103.1 FM.

AM stations

FM stations

External links 

 FCCdata.org: KFNC
 FCCdata.org: KIKR
 FCCdata.org: WAIL
 FCCdata.org: WFKZ
 FCCdata.org: WKWF
 FCCdata.org: WAVK
 FCCdata.org: WMJY
 FCCdata.org: WQBN
 FCCdata.org: WTNI
 FCCdata.org: WANG
 FCCdata.org: W278CE
 FCCdata.org: WVJZ
 FCCdata.org: WFTS-TV
 FCCdata.org: WFTX-TV
 FCCdata.org: WFGX
 FCCdata.org: WGBA-TV
 FCCdata.org: WFXR
 FCCdata.org: WLAX
 FCCdata.org: WQRF-TV
 FCCdata.org: WPGX

References 

Defunct radio broadcasting companies of the United States
Defunct television broadcasting companies of the United States

